Pacheco Island is an island between Vidal Gomez Island and Victoria Island at the north shore of the West entrance of the Strait of Magellan in Chile.

See also
 List of islands of Chile

External links
 Islands of Chile @ United Nations Environment Programme
 World island information @ WorldIslandInfo.com
 South America Island High Points above 1000 meters
 United States Hydrographic Office, South America Pilot (1916)

Queen Adelaide Archipelago
Islands of Magallanes Region

es:Archipiélago Reina Adelaida#Isla Pacheco